State Route 100 (SR 100) is a west–east state highway in both West Tennessee and Middle Tennessee that connects Whiteville with Nashville.

Route description

Hardeman County

SR 100 begins as a primary highway in West Tennessee in Hardeman County at an intersection with US 64/SR 15 in Whiteville. Then SR 100 leaves Whiteville heading east but slightly northward before crossing the Hatchie River. SR 100 then has an intersection with SR 138 just north of Toone. Shortly afterwards, it has an interchange with SR 18 and shortly thereafter enters Chester County.

Chester County

SR 100 has an intersection with SR 125 before entering a hilly area of western Tennessee and passing Chickasaw State Park before intersecting SR 225 and entering Henderson. It then bypasses downtown to the south and has an interchange with US 45/SR 5. SR 100 the leaves Henderson and crosses over the South Fork of the Forked Deer River within a few miles of its inception. It then continues on to Jacks Creek, where it has an intersection with SR 22A, before crossing into Henderson County.

Henderson County

SR 100 continues northeast to intersect SR 22 before having an intersection with SR 104 in Reagan passing through Scotts Hill and having an intersection with SR 114. Scotts Hill resides in Henderson County as well as Decatur County.

Decatur County

Once in Decatur County, SR 100 enters Decaturville and intersects with US 641/SR 69/SR 202, where it becomes a secondary highway, before passing through downtown. The highway then leaves Decaturville and continues northeast to Perryville, where it crosses a bridge over the Beech River before coming to an intersection and becomes concurrent with US 412/SR 20. The highway then crosses the Tennessee River on the Alvin C. York Bridge into Middle Tennessee and Perry County.

Perry County

They then have an intersection with SR 438 before continuing east to Linden, where they pass through downtown before having an intersection with SR 13. US 412/SR 20/SR 100 then leaves Linden and passes through Chestnut Grove before coming to a Y-Intersection where SR 100 splits off from US 412/SR 20 and goes northeast, becoming a primary highway and crossing into Hickman County.

Hickman County

SR 100 continues northeast through rural areas before becoming concurrent with SR 48 before entering Centerville, where they have a short concurrency with SR 50 before passing through downtown and crossing the Duck River. SR 48 then splits off from SR 100 at an intersection with SR 230, which becomes concurrent with SR 100 at this intersection. They then leave Centerville and continue northeast to an intersection where SR 230 splits off and goes southeast, before SR 100 passes through the communities of Wrigley, Lyles, Bon Aqua Junction, and Bon Aqua, where it has an intersection with SR 7 and becomes concurrent with SR 46 shortly before crossing into Williamson County.

Williamson County

SR 46 immediately splits off from SR 100 just feet from SR 100's interchange with I-840 (Exit 7). SR 100 then continues northeast to Fairview where it has an interchange with and becomes concurrent with SR 96, before leaving Fairview and entering the Highland Rim, crossing into Davidson County.

Davidson County

SR 96 then splits off and goes southeast while SR 100 passes through hilly terrain before passing through Pasquo, where it has an interchange with the Natchez Trace Parkway at the Parkway's northern terminus. SR 100 then enters Belle Meade, where it passes through several neighborhoods and has an intersection with SR 254 (Old Hickory Boulevard). SR 100 then passes northwest of Percy Warner Park before coming to an end at US 70S/SR 1.

History

Prior to construction of Interstate 40, SR 100 (in conjunction US 64 between Bartlett and Whiteville) was a customarily traveled route between Memphis and Nashville but today serves primarily local traffic.

Major intersections

See also

 List of state routes in Tennessee
 List of highways numbered 100

References

External links

100